FC SKVICH Minsk was a Belarusian football club based in Minsk, last playing in the Belarusian Second League.

History
The team was founded in late 2000 by travel company SKVICH, which had had investments in sport and football projects (such as their own football school) for several years. Before the start of their first season, after gaining support from Belarusian Railways, the team was renamed Lokomotiv Minsk. The team won the Second League in 2001 and finished 3rd in the First League the following year and was promoted to the Belarusian Premier League.

Lokomotiv finished in the relegation zone of the table in three of their four seasons in the Premier League; twice they were promoted after only one season, until they got stuck in the First League following relegation in 2008. In 2009, they reverted to their original name SKVICH Minsk.

Lokomotiv reached the final of the 2002–03 Belarusian Cup, losing to Dinamo Minsk.

The club was dissolved after 2014 season.

Honours 
 Belarusian Cup 
 Runners-up (1): 2003

League and Cup history

External links 
Official Club Website (inactive since 2003)
Lokomotiv Minsk at EUFO.DE
Profile at footballfacts.ru

Defunct football clubs in Belarus
Football clubs in Minsk
2000 establishments in Belarus
2014 disestablishments in Belarus
Association football clubs established in 2000
Association football clubs disestablished in 2014